Mäurer & Wirtz is a German manufacturer of personal care products and perfumes. Since 1990 the company has been a subsidiary of Dalli Group.

The company is managed by the fifth generation of the Wirtz family, joint CEO Hermann Wirtz.

The headquarters and production site is in Stolberg near the city of Aachen with 400 employees. The company sells a range of consumer products using the sales divisions Cosmeurop Perfumes, Théany Cosmetics, NewYorker Cosmetics, s.Oliver Cosmetics and comma Cosmetics. Besides its own brands, such as Betty Barclay and 4711, the company produces licensed brands, such as s.Oliver and Otto Kern.

The main markets are Germany, Belgium, the Netherlands, Luxembourg, Austria,  and Switzerland. The company's products are distributed and sold through perfumery and drugstore retailers, department stores, drug stores and selected supermarkets.

History 
The family business was founded by Michael Mäurer and his stepson Andreas August Wirtz, who established a soapworks in Stolberg in 1845. The company initially produced soft soaps, curd soaps and fine soaps which were sold in a local grocery store. Over time, markets were established in Rhineland, Germany, and in neighbouring countries (mainly France, Belgium, the Netherlands, and Luxembourg). In 1884, the company began producing washing powder. The company's first trademarks were registered at the turn of the century.

Nazi period
In 1939, the company was being run by Hermann Wirtz with the support of his twin brother, Alfred, an engineer. Both brothers were Nazi party members. The company split into three related companies: Mäurer & Wirtz; Chemie Grünenthal, which famously developed and marketed the embryopathic drug Thalidomide; and Dalli-Group.

Modern Mäurer & Wirtz
Mäurer & Wirtz now produces detergents, soap products, perfumes and cosmetics.  Since 1992, products under the Betty Barclay brand have been produced under license. In 2007, the company took over the brands 4711, Tosca, Sir Irisch Moos and Extase from Procter & Gamble, and in 2011 the Baldessarini fragrance line, and Windsor were acquired.

Products 

Mäurer & Wirtz divided its assortment in 2010 into three business units, which will cover different market and user segments: The segment "Beauty" includes own brands and licensed brands from the low-price sector, the pillar "prestige" is in charge for luxury fragrances and under the third segment "4711" the products from the Cologne "Glockengasse" were brought together:

External links 
 Website of Mäurer & Wirtz

References 

Personal care brands
Companies based in North Rhine-Westphalia
Companies established in 1845
Cosmetics companies of Germany
German brands
Perfume houses